Francis Covers the Big Town is a 1953 American black-and-white comedy film from Universal-International, produced by Leonard Goldstein, directed by Arthur Lubin, that stars Donald O'Connor, Yvette Duguay, and Gene Lockhart. The distinctive voice of Francis is a voice-over by actor Chill Wills.

This is the fourth film in Universal-International's Francis the Talking Mule series continuing the misadventures of Peter Stirling and his friend Francis. Diabolique argued it was the best in the series.

Plot
Peter lands a job at a big New York City newspaper and while on assignment gets framed for a murder.

Cast
Donald O'Connor as Peter Stirling
Yvette Duguay as Maria Scola
Gene Lockhart as Tom Henderson
Nancy Guild as Alberta Ames
William Harrigan as Deputy Chief Inspector Hansen
Silvio Minciotti as Salvatore Scola
Lowell Gilmore as Jefferson Garnet
Larry Gates as Dan Austin
Hanley Stafford as Dr. Goodrich
Gale Gordon as District Attorney Evans
Forrest Lewis as Judge Stanley
John Qualen as Defense Attorney Cavendish

Production
Production of the film was announced in July 1951 and was to be the third in the Francis series.

Oscar Brodney was assigned to write the script. David Stern reportedly also worked on the script.

Filming started in August 1951 and involved ten days location shooting in New York.

Francis was flown to New York and back on a cargo plane, which cost $700 plus airfares for his trainer and two handlers.

At one stage of production, the film was going to be known as Francis, Racket Buster.

Director Arthur Lubin complained during filming that he was becoming typecast as an animal director. He hoped to make The Interruption from a suspense story by W. W. Mason "just to remind producers that I can direct people too."

Video releases
The original film, Francis (1950), was released in 1978 as one of the first-ever titles in the new LaserDisc format, DiscoVision Catalog #22-003. It was then re-issued on LaserDisc in May 1994 by MCA/Universal Home Video (Catalog #: 42024) as part of an Encore Edition Double Feature with Francis Goes to the Races (1951).

The first two Francis films were released again in 2004 by Universal Pictures on Region 1 and Region 4 DVD, along with the next two in the series, as The Adventures of Francis the Talking Mule Vol. 1. Several years later, Universal released all 7 Francis films as a set on three Region 1 and Region 4 DVDs, Francis The Talking Mule: The Complete Collection.

References

External links

1953 films
1953 comedy films
1950s crime comedy films
1950s fantasy comedy films
American black-and-white films
American crime comedy films
American fantasy comedy films
Films about journalism
Films directed by Arthur Lubin
Films scored by Frank Skinner
Films scored by Herman Stein
Films set in New York City
Universal Pictures films
Films about donkeys
1950s English-language films
1950s American films
Big Town